Myra Cohen (12 May 1892 – 16 November 1959) was a New Zealand barber, dental assistant, entertainer and milliner. She was born in Reefton, West Coast, New Zealand on 12 May 1892.

References

Further reading 

 Cowman SC. Myra Cohen: a New Zealand dental mechanic. Dental Historian 1994 Nov;(27):8-12. PMID: 9879202.

1892 births
1959 deaths
New Zealand dentists
People from Reefton
20th-century dentists